Woman with Birthmark (Kvinna med födelsemärke) is a 1996 novel by Håkan Nesser,  which won the Best Swedish Crime Novel Award in the same year.  The English translation was published in 2009.

It was also made into a Swedish mini-series for TV in 2001.

References

1996 novels
Swedish crime novels